The Boterdorpse Verlaat is a lock between the River Rotte and Strekvaart in Bergse Plassen in the municipality of Rotterdam. [1] The fairway was formerly used by vessels carrying malt wastes from Schiedam but nowadays is very rarely used even for pleasure.

The lock dates from 1740 and has the characteristic performance of locks from that period. The lock walls are not brick, but of wood. The construction is up, along with wooden yokes. A similar lock is the Bleiswijkse Verlaat . 

Behind the gate is a fixed bridge, whose height in the closed position is only a few centimeters above the polder level .

Rijksmonuments in Rotterdam
Locks of the Netherlands